Agostini's reaction is a simple medical test for the presence of glucose in urine. 

The method consists of adding the urine to a prepared solution of auric chloride and potassium oxide. If there is glucose present, the solution becomes red.

See also 
 List of medical tests

References 

Medical tests